The 2021 Chinese Women's Super League, officially known as the 2021 China Taiping Chinese Football Association Women's Super League for sponsorship reasons, was the 7th season in its current incarnation, and the 25th total season of the women's association football league in China. It was held from 8 May to 30 November 2021 at Yunnan Haigeng Football Training Base, Kunming.

Clubs

Name changes
 Meizhou Huijun F.C. was acquired by men's football club Meizhou Hakka as their women's football section and changed their name to Meizhou Hakka W.F.C. in December 2020.

Stadiums and locations

Foreign players
Clubs can register a total of four foreign players (excluding goalkeepers) over the course of the season, but the number of foreign players allowed on each team at any given time is limited to three. A maximum of two foreign players can be fielded at any given time in each match.

Regular season

League table

Results

Positions by round

Results by match played

Championship stage

League table

Results

Positions by round

Results by match played

Relegation stage

League table

Results

Positions by round

Results by match played

Championship playoffs

Overview

Match

Third place playoffs

Overview

Match

Sixth place playoffs

Overview

Match

Eighth place playoffs
The loser will qualify for relegation play-offs.

Overview

Match

Relegation play-offs

Overview

Match

Statistics

Top scorers

Top assists

References

External links
Official Website (Desktop view)
Official Website (Mobile view)

2021
2020–21 domestic women's association football leagues
2021–22 domestic women's association football leagues
+